Hydrelia bicauliata is a moth in the family Geometridae first described by Louis Beethoven Prout in 1914. It is found in China, Japan, Korea and Russia.

The wingspan is 17–22 mm.

References

Moths described in 1914
Asthenini
Moths of Asia